Plicopurpura pansa is a species of sea snail, a marine gastropod mollusk in the family Muricidae, the murex snails or rock snails.

Description

Plicopurpura pansa can be recognized for its usage to create one of the dyes produced from animal sources, Tyrian purple. This organism is the only one from its family that can have its dye expelled and collected without causing harm or execution to it.Historically, this shellfish has been “milked” by excreting the dye from the hypobranchial gland. Once this liquid was extracted, it would be implemented for the use of dying fabrics. In Oaxacan communities the milking of these organisms can garner up to 2.5 liters of dye per week.

Distribution

References

Plicopurpura
Gastropods described in 1853